The College Football Playoff National Championship is a post-season college football bowl game, used to determine a national champion of the NCAA Division I Football Bowl Subdivision (FBS), which began play in the 2014 college football season. The game serves as the final of the College Football Playoff, a bracket tournament between the top four teams in the country as determined by a selection committee, which was established as a successor to the Bowl Championship Series and its similar BCS National Championship Game.

The participating teams in the College Football Playoff National Championship are determined by two semifinal games (sometimes called the "Plus-One system"), hosted by an annual rotation of bowls commonly known as the New Year's Six. Thus, the teams to compete in the final are not directly selected by a selection committee, as had been the format used for the BCS National Championship Game.

The game is played at a neutral site, determined through bids by prospective host cities (similar to the Super Bowl and NCAA Final Four). When announcing it was soliciting bids for the 2016 and 2017 title games, playoff organizers noted that the bids must propose host stadiums with a capacity of at least 65,000 spectators, and cities cannot host both a semi-final game and the title game in the same year.

The winner of the game is awarded the College Football Playoff National Championship Trophy, which is sponsored by Dr Pepper. It was created as a new championship trophy, rather than the "crystal football" that has been given by the American Football Coaches Association (AFCA) since 1986, as officials wanted a new trophy that was unconnected with the previous BCS championship system.

The inaugural game was held at AT&T Stadium in Arlington, Texas, on January 12, 2015, and was won by Ohio State. A top-ranked team did not win the College Football Playoff National Championship until LSU won the sixth edition of the game, in January 2020. Alabama has the most appearances in a College Football Playoff National Championship, with six, and also the most wins, with three.

Note that the College Football Playoff National Championship is not awarded by the National Collegiate Athletic Association (NCAA). The highest level of college football that the NCAA awards a championship in is the Division I Football Championship Subdivision (FCS).

Venues

The number of cities capable of bidding for the event is restricted by the 65,000-seat stadium minimum. In addition to Raymond James Stadium in Tampa, which was the other finalist for the 2015 matchup, the stadium restriction would limit the bidding to cities such as New Orleans, Glendale, and Pasadena. Other possible future hosts include Orlando, San Antonio, and almost any city with a National Football League franchise, since all but three of the stadiums in that league (only one, the Chicago Bears' Soldier Field, will fall short beginning with the 2020 season) meet the capacity requirements and, unlike the Super Bowl, there is no de jure restriction on climate. Officials in New York City said they would like to host the game at Yankee Stadium, which hosts the annual Pinstripe Bowl, but it falls short of the attendance limit as it only holds approximately 54,000 fans in its football configuration—a game could still be hosted in the New York metropolitan area, but it would have to be at MetLife Stadium in East Rutherford, New Jersey.

On December 16, 2013, host selections for the 2016 and 2017 title games were announced. Glendale, Arizona (University of Phoenix Stadium) was selected to host the 2016 game and Tampa, Florida (Raymond James Stadium) was selected to host the 2017 game. Four cities had submitted bids for the 2016 game: Glendale, Jacksonville (TIAA Bank Field), New Orleans (Mercedes-Benz Superdome), and Tampa. Six metropolitan areas had been vying for the 2017 game: Tampa, the San Francisco Bay Area (Levi's Stadium), Minneapolis (U.S. Bank Stadium), San Antonio (Alamodome), South Florida (Hard Rock Stadium), and Jacksonville (TIAA Bank Field).

The host for the 2020 game was announced on November 4, 2015.
2020 – Mercedes-Benz Superdome in New Orleans.

The hosts for the 2021 through 2024 games were announced November 1, 2017.
 2021 – Hard Rock Stadium in Miami Gardens, Florida.
 2022 – Lucas Oil Stadium in Indianapolis, Indiana.
 2023 – SoFi Stadium in Inglewood, California.
 2024 – NRG Stadium in Houston, Texas.

The hosts for the 2025 and 2026 games were announced on January 6, 2022.
 2025 - Mercedes-Benz Stadium in Atlanta, Georgia
 2026 – Hard Rock Stadium in Miami Gardens, Florida.

The 2025 game was originally supposed to be played at Allegiant Stadium in Las Vegas, Nevada, but the game was moved to Atlanta due to a conflict with the Consumer Electronics Show happening around the same time. Since cities hosting College Football Playoff semifinal games cannot host the final in the same year, Pasadena and New Orleans were not eligible for the 2018 game; South Florida and North Texas could not host in 2019; and Glendale and Atlanta were excluded from 2020 consideration. The same exclusions rotate every three years through 2026.

Game results

Rankings are from the CFP Poll released prior to matchup.

 Attendance at the January 2021 game was limited due to the COVID-19 pandemic in the United States.

Source:

Future games

Appearances by team

Championship round, updated through the January 2023 edition (9 games, 18 total appearances).

Semifinals, updated through the January 2023 edition (18 games, 36 total appearances).

Appearances by conference
Updated through the January 2023 edition (9 games, 18 total appearances).

Coaches
The following coaches led their teams to the National Championship final. Including the January 2022 game, Nick Saban has reached the final the most times, six, with a 3–3 record.

Appearances by coach

MVPs 

An offensive MVP and defensive MVP are named for each final.

Game records

Broadcasters

Television

Radio

Local radio

See also
 College football national championships in NCAA Division I FBS
 Mythical national championship

References

External links

Championship Game
College sports championships in the United States
Annual sporting events in the United States
Recurring sporting events established in 2015